C. fragilis may refer to:
 Campodea fragilis, a diplura arthropod species in the genus Campodea
 Chickcharnea fragilis, a sea snail species
 Chingkankousaurus fragilis, a theropod dinosaur species from the late Cretaceous Period
 Citharichthys fragilis, the gulf sanddab, a fish species native to the eastern Pacific Ocean
 Coelurus fragilis, a dinosaur species from the Late Jurassic period
 Cystopteris fragilis, the brittle bladderfern or common fragile fern, a fern species

See also
 Fragilis (disambiguation)